Leuciscus lindbergi is a species of cyprinid fish described from the Talas River, Turkestan.

References 

Leuciscus
Fish described in 1934